The Château de la Mothe is a château in Saint-Privat-des-Prés, Dordogne, Nouvelle-Aquitaine, France.

Châteaux in Dordogne